This is an incomplete list of notable or famous Ahmadi Muslims, members of the Ahmadiyya Muslim Community - a movement within Islam.

Religious figures

Founder
Mirza Ghulam Ahmad – The founder of the Ahmadiyya movement

Caliphs
Maulana Hakeem Noor-ud-Din – First Caliph
Mirza Basheer-ud-Din Mahmood Ahmad – Second Caliph
Mirza Nasir Ahmad – Third Caliph
Mirza Tahir Ahmad – Fourth Caliph
Mirza Masroor Ahmad – Fifth Caliph and current leader of the worldwide Ahmadiyya Muslim Community

Companions
Mufti Muhammad Sadiq
A. R. Dard
Abdul Rahim Nayyar
Maulvi Sher Ali
Fateh Muhammad Sial
Shams ud Din Khan
Khwaja Kamal-ud-Din
Maulana Muhammad Ali
Malik Ghulam Farid
Mirza Bashir Ahmad
Khwaja Nazir Ahmad
Qazi Muhammad Yousaf
Mirza Muhammad Ismail
Sayyid Abdul Latif

Missionaries
Bashir Ahmad Orchard – first Missionary of the Ahmadiyya Community of European descent
Abdul Wahab Adam – Ameer (Head) of the Ahmadiyya Muslim Mission, Ghana; member of National Peace Council; member of National Reconciliation Commission

Lahore Ahmadiyya Emirs
Maulana Muhammad Ali
Saeed Ahmad Khan
Asghar Hameed
Maulana Sadr-ud-Din
Abdul Karim Saeed Pasha

Royalty

Kings

Beninese

Kpodégbé Lanmanfan Toyi Djigla – King of the Fon State of Alada; President of the Supreme Council of Kings of Benin
Akpaki Dagbara II – King of the Bariba State of Paraku, Benin
Egba Kotan II – King of the Yoruba State of Dassa, Benin
Orou Igbo Akambi – King of Toui, Benin

Other nationalities

Musendiku Buraimoh Adeniji Adele II – King of Lagos, Nigeria
Mumuni Koray – Ruler of Wa, Ghana

Other royalty

Khalil Gamanga – Paramount Chief of the Simbaru Chiefdom, Kenema District, Sierra Leone
Kenawa Gamanga – Paramount Chief of the Simbaru Chiefdom, Kenema District, Sierra Leone

Artists

Musicians
Yusef Lateef – American Ahmadi spokesperson; Jazz multiinstrumentalist; Grammy Award winner
Ahmad Jamal – American jazz pianist
Art Blakey – American jazz drummer
Rudy Powell – American jazz reed player
Sahib Shihab – American jazz Saxophonist
Dakota Staton – American jazz vocalist
McCoy Tyner – American jazz pianist
Sadik Hakim – American jazz pianist
Abbey Lincoln – American jazz vocalist, songwriter, actress
Talib Dawud – Anitguan-born American jazz Trumpeter
Ahmed Abdul-Malik – American jazz double bassist
Idrees Sulieman – American jazz Trumpeter

Writers
Aziz Kashmiri – Kashmiri journalist
Wage Rudolf Supratman – Indonesian National Hero and songwriter; wrote the national anthem of Indonesia, "Indonesian Raya"
Muhammad Fazal Khan Changwi – translator of works by Ibn Arabi
Qalandar Momand – Pakistani poet, writer, journalist, critic, academician, lexicographer. Recipient of Pakistan's Pride of Performance civil award, the National Award for Democracy and Sitara-e-Imtiaz
Obaidullah Aleem – Urdu poet
Babatunde Jose – Nigerian journalist
Hadayatullah Hübsch – German writer and journalist
Khola Maryam Hübsch – German writer and journalist, daughter of Hadayatullah
Qasim Rashid – American writer
Sabir Zafar – Pakistani songwriter, lyricist and poet.
Qamar Ajnalvi – Pakistani novelist

Actors
Mahershala Ali – American actor, first Muslim actor to win an Oscar

Politicians

Ghanaians
Alhaji Mahama Iddrisu – member of the Council of State and former Minister for Defence
Alhaji Malik Al-Hassan Yakubu – member of Pan-African Parliament and former Minister for Interior
Kobina Tahir Hammond – Member of Parliament for Adansi Asokwa, Ashanti Region
Ameen Salifu – Member of Parliament for Wa East, Upper West Region
Alhaji Issifu Ali – former co-chairman of the National Democratic Congress
Musheibu Mohammed Alfa – Deputy Minister of Environment, Science and Innovation
Mahmud Khalid – former Minister of State for Upper West Region
Alhaji Mumuni Abudu Seidu – former Minister of State without portfolio; former Member of Parliament, Wa Central, Upper West Region
Alhaji Mogtari Sahanun – former Ghana ambassador to Burkina Faso; former Minister of State for Upper West Region

Nigerians
Alhaji Abdul Azeez Kolawole Adeyemo – Member of Parliament, front-line member of Action Group political party, Ondo State Parliamentary Co-ordinator
Alhaji Jibril Martin – president of the Nigerian Youth Movement; cofounder and chairman of the Hajj Pilgrims’ Board of Nigeria's western region

Pakistanis
Muhammad Zafrulla Khan – President of the UN General Assembly, First Foreign Minister of Pakistan, President of the International Court of Justice

United Kingdom
Tariq Ahmad, Baron Ahmad of Wimbledon – Member of the House of Lords, UK, Minister for the Commonwealth and the United Nations at the Foreign and Commonwealth Office.
Iftikhar A. Ayaz – Tuvaluan consular official, UK
Imran Ahmad Khan – Member of Parliament (MP) for Wakefield.

Other nationalities
Farimang Mamadi Singateh – second and last Governor General of The Gambia
Sahibzada Abdul Latif – Afghan Ahmadi Muslim martyr; king Abdur Rahman Khan's advisor; government representative for the Durand Line
Amir Abedi – first African mayor of Dar es Salam, Tanzania
Barakat Ahmad – Indian diplomat
Muhammad Fiaz – Member of the Legislative Assembly of Saskatchewan, Canada

International bodies
Muhammad Zafrulla Khan – President of the UN General Assembly, first Foreign Minister of Pakistan, President of the International Court of Justice
M M Ahmad – former executive director and vice president of the World Bank

Military
Air Marshal Zafar Chaudhry – first Chief of Air Staff and a three-star general of the Pakistan Air Force
Lieutenant General Akhtar Hussain Malik – lieutenant general of the Pakistan Army
Major General Iftikhar Janjua Shaheed – major general of the Pakistan Army; 1965 war hero, killed in the 1971 war
Lieutenant General Abdul Ali Malik – Pakistani war hero of the Chawinda, 1965 Indo-Pakistan war
Major General Abdullah Saeed – Commandant of the Pakistan Military Academy at Kakul,  Chief Martial Law Administrator for Baluchistan, Pakistan

Business and economics 
M M Ahmad – former executive director and vice president of the World Bank
Faysal Sohail – American venture capitalist
Atif Mian – Top 25 Economist of the world. Prime Minister Imran Khan selected Mian as one of Pakistan's economists, he reached international notability in 2018 after his forced removal because he is an Ahmadi Muslim. The International Monetary Fund (IMF) identified Mian as one of twenty-five economists it expects to shape the world's thinking about the global economy in the future.
Amjad Khan Chowdhury– Founder of PRAN-RFL Group

Scientists
Professor Abdus Salam – First Pakistani and first Ahmadi Muslim recipient of a Nobel Prize in Physics
Mujaddid Ahmed Ijaz – Pakistani-American experimental physicist noted for his role in discovering new isotopes
Mojib Latif – German meteorologist and oceanographer of Pakistani descent
Hafiz Saleh Muhammad Alladin – Indian astronomer, professor at Osmania University, Hydrabad, India
Clement Lindley Wragge – New Zealander meteorologist
Baron Omar Rolf von Ehrenfels – Austrian German Orientalist and anthropologist

Sportspersons
Abdul Jeelani – American professional basketball player
Adnan Virk – Canadian sports anchor
Waseem Ahmed  - Pakistani field hockey player and ex-captain of Pakistan hockey team

Others
Sitara Brooj Akbar – World's youngest O'Levels awardee and IELTS candidate.
A. George Baker – American Protestant clergyman who converted to Islam
Asad Shah – British murder victim of a religiously-motivated attack
Nazhat Shameem – Former High Court Judge, Fiji
Shaista Shameem – Indo-Fijian lawyer; former director of the Fiji Human Rights Commission

References

Ahmadis